The Silver Surfer is a fictional character appearing in American comic books published by Marvel Comics. The character also appears in a number of movies, television, and video game adaptations. The character was created by Jack Kirby and first appeared in the comic book Fantastic Four #48, published in 1966.

The Silver Surfer is a humanoid alien with metallic skin who can travel through space with the aid of his surfboard-like craft. Originally a young astronomer named Norrin Radd on the planet Zenn-La, he saved his homeworld from the planet devourer, Galactus, by serving as his herald. Imbued in return with some portion of Galactus' Power Cosmic, he acquired vast power, a new body and a surfboard-like craft on which he could travel faster than light. Now known as the Silver Surfer, he roamed the cosmos searching for planets for Galactus to consume. When his travels took him to Earth, he met the Fantastic Four, who helped him rediscover his nobility of spirit. Betraying Galactus, he saved Earth but was exiled there as punishment.

In 2011, IGN ranked the Silver Surfer 41st in its "Top 100 Comic Heroes" list. The character was portrayed by Doug Jones and voiced by Laurence Fishburne in the 2007 film Fantastic Four: Rise of the Silver Surfer.

Publication history
Created by Jack Kirby, the character first appears in The Fantastic Four #48 (March 1966), the first of a three-issue arc that fans call "The Galactus Trilogy".

Early appearances
The Silver Surfer debuted as an unplanned addition to the superhero-team comic Fantastic Four #48 (March 1966). The comic's writer-editor, Stan Lee, and its penciller and co-plotter, Jack Kirby, had, by the mid-1960s, developed a collaborative technique known as the "Marvel Method": the two would discuss story ideas, Kirby working from a brief synopsis to draw the individual scenes and plot details, with Lee finally adding the dialogue and captions. When Kirby turned in his pencil art for the story, he included a new character he and Lee had not discussed. As Lee recalled in 1995, "There, in the middle of the story we had so carefully worked out, was a nut on some sort of flying surfboard". He later expanded on this, recalling, "I thought, 'Jack, this time you've gone too far'". Kirby explained that the story's agreed-upon antagonist, a god-like cosmic predator of planets named Galactus, should have some sort of herald, and that he created the surfboard "because I'm tired of drawing spaceships!" Taken by the noble features of the new character, who turned on his master to help defend Earth, Lee overcame his initial skepticism and began adding characterization. The Silver Surfer soon became a key part of the unfolding story.

Following the Surfer's debut, Lee and Kirby brought him back as a recurring guest in Fantastic Four #55–61, 72, and 74–77 (ranging Oct. 1966 – Aug. 1968). The character made his solo debut in the backup story of Fantastic Four Annual #5 (Nov. 1967).

The following year, Lee launched the solo title The Silver Surfer. John Buscema was penciller for the first 17 issues of the series, with Kirby returning for the 18th and final issue. The first seven issues, which included anthological "Tales of the Watcher" backup stories, were 72-page (with advertising), 25-cent "giants", as opposed to the typical 36-page, 12-cent comics of the time. Thematically, the stories dealt with the Surfer's exile on Earth and the inhumanity of man as observed by this noble yet fallen hero. Though short-lived, the series became known as one of Lee's most thoughtful and introspective works.

Following his series' cancellation, the Surfer made sporadic appearances as a guest star or antagonist in such comic books as Thor, The Defenders, and Fantastic Four. Lee remained partial to the Surfer, even asking other writers not to use him as a general rule, and with Kirby collaborated on a seminal 1978 graphic novel starring the character, the only original story featured in the Marvel Fireside Books series.

Subsequent series
After a 1982 one-shot by writer-artist John Byrne (with scripting by Stan Lee), the Surfer appeared in his second solo ongoing title in 1987.

Initially written by Steve Englehart, the series was to be set on Earth and one issue was completed under this premise before Marvel agreed to let Englehart remove the long-standing restriction regarding Silver Surfer being imprisoned on Earth. This first issue was shelved and a brand new first issue was written, to set up this plot twist; the original first issue would ultimately be reprinted in Marvel Fanfare #51. The series marked the first Silver Surfer stories not written by Stan Lee, a fact which Lee was openly unhappy about. He explained: 

Englehart introduced many villains for Silver Surfer, as well as featured space politics involving Surfer's homeworld Zenn-La, which was caught in the middle of a renewed Kree–Skrull War. However, issues regarding Englehart wanting to use his Avengers character Mantis as Silver Surfer's companion, as well as editorial refusing to let him use Thanos or other concepts conceived by Jim Starlin, led Englehart to leave the book with issue #31. Starlin took over as writer with issue #34 after several fill-in issues, and incorporated Thanos, Adam Warlock, and Drax the Destroyer into the series.

Under Jim Starlin and later Ron Marz, the series would receive acclaim and sales boost due to Silver Surfer's involvement with Starlin's Infinity Trilogy, with George Pérez and J. M. DeMatteis also having brief writing stints on the series as well. Additional artists included Tom Grindberg, Ron Garney, and Jon J. Muth, as well as periodic guest spots by John Buscema. The title experienced great initial success which allowed Marvel to push the character into other media, including a 1990 video game, 1992 trading card set, and 1998 animated series, as well as spinning off a variety of other comics series including Cosmic Powers, Cosmic Powers Unlimited, Captain Marvel vol. 2, and Star Masters. It ran 146 issues, through 1998. The next year it was followed by the two-issue miniseries, Silver Surfer: Loftier Than Mortals.

A two-issue Silver Surfer miniseries (later collected as Silver Surfer: Parable), scripted by Lee and drawn by Moebius, was published through Marvel's Epic Comics imprint in 1988 and 1989. Because of inconsistencies with other stories, it has been argued that these stories actually feature an alternate Silver Surfer from a parallel Earth. This miniseries won the Eisner Award for best finite/limited series in 1989.

2000s
A new ongoing Silver Surfer series began in 2003, focusing on the character's alien nature and messianic allegory. It lasted 14 issues. The Surfer later appeared in an issue of Cable & Deadpool and has been reunited three times with the superhero group the Defenders. In 2006–2007, he starred in the four-issue miniseries Annihilation: Silver Surfer and co-starred in the miniseries Heralds of Galactus, both part of the Annihilation fictional crossover.

In 2007, the Silver Surfer starred in a four-issue miniseries Silver Surfer: Requiem by writer J. Michael Straczynski and artist Esad Ribic. The first issue was released May 30, 2007 to coincide with the character's first movie appearance. Published under the Marvel Knights imprint, Silver Surfer: Requiem portrays the character upon learning that he is dying as the silver shell he is encased in is deteriorating.

This was followed by the four-issue miniseries Silver Surfer: In Thy Name, by writer Simon Spurrier and artist Tan Eng Huat.

After an appearance in the "Planet Hulk" storyline in 2006, the Surfer was featured in its spin-off series starring the Hulk's son Skaar in 2008, both written by Greg Pak.

2010s
The Silver Surfer received a sixth volume, an eponymous 5-issue miniseries written by Pak, debuting in February 2011. He was also a core cast member in The Thanos Imperative (2010), Annihilators (2011), and Fear Itself: The Deep (2011). Beginning in 2011, the Silver Surfer began appearing regularly in The Mighty Thor and a new volume of Defenders, both written by Matt Fraction.

In March 2014, Silver Surfer volume 7 began as part of All-New Marvel NOW! by writer Dan Slott, artist Mike Allred, and colorist Laura Allred. In January 2016 Silver Surfer volume 8 began with a special 50th-anniversary edition expected release in March 2016.

In 2019, a 5-part mini-series titled Silver Surfer: Black was released featuring art from Tradd Moore in collaboration with writing from Donny Cates. The series is an extension of a Guardians of the Galaxy storyline in which the Surfer was sucked into a black hole and ejected into unfamiliar space territory. This run follows the Surfer as he traverses the spaceways on a journey back home.

2020
Silver Surfer later plays an important role in King in Black storyline. With the help from Hugin and Munin, Surfer helps Enigma Force to enter Earth and chose Eddie Brock/Venom as a temporary Captain Universe, to aid his fellow heroes against Knull and his army.

Fictional character biography
Norrin Radd is from the utopian planet Zenn-La, in the Deneb star system of the Milky Way galaxy. He is the son of Jartran and Elmar Radd, and he has a half-brother, Fennan Radd. Zenn-La's ancient and significantly advanced civilization has lost the will to strive or explore, leaving the young scholar Norrin Radd restless and yearning for adventure. Facing the destruction of his world by planet-consuming Galactus, Radd bargains with the cosmic being. In return for the safety of Zenn-La and his lover, Shalla-Bal, Radd pledges to seek out planets for the world devourer to consume as his herald. Galactus imbues him with a portion of the Power Cosmic, transforming him into the Silver Surfer. Radd had intended to lead Galactus to uninhabited planets, but Galactus tampers with his soul to prevent this.

Radd serves Galactus for an unspecified amount of time. Eventually, the Surfer summons his master to Earth. Here the Surfer meets the Fantastic Four and Alicia Masters. Touched by their nobility, he rebels against Galactus, who is eventually driven off. Before he leaves, he confines the Surfer to Earth with an invisible barrier that affects only him.

During his exile, the Surfer fights numerous villains, including Doctor Doom, who wants his Power Cosmic, and Mephisto, who wants his soul. The Surfer's only ally during these trials is a physicist by the name of Al B. Harper, who eventually sacrifices himself to save the world from the Stranger.

Banding together with the Hulk and Namor during these wanderings, the Surfer forms the "Titans Three", a group dedicated to battling evil on Earth. Soon, Doctor Strange joins the group and it becomes "The Defenders." Surfer stays with them for a while, but his overwhelming desire to be free of Earth and his frequent collisions with Galactus's energy-draining barrier eventually drives him to leave the group.

The Surfer finally pierces Galactus's barrier with the aid of Reed Richards and temporarily escapes Earth. He discovers, though, that his homeworld has been ravaged by Galactus and Shalla-Bal has been abducted by Mephisto and taken to Earth. Even though it means trapping himself once more, the Surfer returns to Earth to battle and defeat Mephisto. Before being vanquished, Mephisto sends Shalla-Bal back to Zenn-La, but the Surfer manages to endow her with a portion of his Power Cosmic, which she uses to revitalize the plant life of their ravaged homeworld.

After the Surfer aids the Fantastic Four against Galactus's latest herald Terrax, The Surfer eventually pierces Galactus's barrier by acting on a suggestion of trying to pass through on a spaceship instead of via his own power on his surfboard. He also makes peace with Galactus by rescuing current herald Nova from the Skrulls. Galactus declares the Surfer's exile ended. The Surfer immediately revisits his homeworld, but Shalla-Bal, in his absence, had become empress of the rejuvenated Zenn-La and is unable to renew their romance.

Embroiled in fresh hostilities between the interstellar Kree and Skrull empires, the Surfer also intervenes in a series of plots by the Elders of the Universe, who plan to become supremely powerful by destroying Galactus and the universe with him. The Surfer thwarts this plot with the aid of his new love interest, Mantis, the Earth-born cosmic heroine also known as the "Celestial Madonna". She seems to die in the process, and although she eventually returns, she never fully renews their romance. After this loss, a grief-stricken Surfer turns to Nova and romantic feelings begin to develop between them. The Surfer's influence gradually leads Nova to question the morality of her role as herald to Galactus. Eventually replaced by the far more ruthless Morg, Nova dies in a conflict between the new herald and the Surfer and the other ex-heralds.

The Surfer repeatedly battles space-born menaces, the chief of whom is Thanos, who attempts to kill half the life in the universe using the omnipotent Infinity Gauntlet. Through Thanos, the Surfer learns how Galactus had altered his soul. He convinces Galactus to restore it, but once Galactus has done so, the Surfer is overcome with grief until he is able to forgive himself. The Surfer finds interstellar allies in Adam Warlock's Infinity Watch and the "Star Masters" team, and he begins attending occasional Defenders reunions.

The Surfer returns home to Zenn-La to find that the planet has vanished, and learns it was actually destroyed in the 1940s (Earth time) by the entity known as the Other. Zenn-La and its people which the Surfer repeatedly encountered since leaving Galactus's service were actually reproductions, created by Galactus so that the Surfer would have a home to return to. Losing his capacity for emotion again, the Surfer returns to Earth. He later regains his personality during a time-travel adventure and sharing a romance with Alicia Masters. The two ultimately part as friends after many adventures together.

Silver Surfer temporarily bonds with and is controlled by the Carnage symbiote, which is seeking revenge for the destruction of its homeworld.

Later, the Surfer works with the alien Annunaki race to gather and protect some of Earth's most extraordinarily gifted children. In the end, one of these children, Ellie Waters, saves Earth from the godlike Marduk entity, preventing the Apocalypse and reordering reality as if the Marduk crisis had never happened (though Ellie alone apparently retains her memories of these events). The Surfer resumes his interstellar wanderings, but promises to be ready to aid his adopted homeworld should Earth ever need him.

During his travels, the Surfer is captured by a portal of the Sakaar Empire. Left weakened and vulnerable by his trip through the portal, the Surfer is subdued and implanted with an obedience disk to ensure he remains loyal to them. Fighting as a gladiator (and believed to be the fabled 'Sakaarson' due to his appearance), the Surfer is finally forced to face the Hulk along with his Warbound. Through teamwork and distraction, the Hulk is eventually able to destroy the Surfer's obedience disk. The Hulk and several other slaves and gladiators are freed when the Surfer uses the Power Cosmic to remove their own obedience disks and give them a way out of the arena, although the Hulk declines the Surfer's offer to take him back to Earth.

During the Annihilation war, the Silver Surfer again becomes Galactus's herald to help save the universe from the despot Annihilus. Annihilus captures them and gives them to Thanos for experimentation. Drax the Destroyer frees the Surfer, who in turn frees Galactus. An enraged Galactus destroys more than half the Annihilation Wave, and Annihilus is defeated. Later, the Surfer is joined as herald by Stardust, a former herald the Surfer had replaced.

The Silver Surfer leads the world devourer to the populated planet Orbucen, which brings him into conflict with Richard Rider. He delays the planetary destruction to give the inhabitants more time to evacuate.

The Silver Surfer returns to Sakaar in a plan to feed Galactus with the unique "Old Power" which he claims would sate his master's hunger for thousands of years, sparing many other inhabited worlds. He is opposed by the Hulk's son, Skaar, and is enslaved by an obedience disc. The conflict is ended when Skaar's mother Caiera sacrifices her soul and Old Power as sustenance for Galactus. Unfortunately, Galactus now seems addicted to the Old Power and has begun searching for other planets containing it to sate himself.

After an encounter with the High Evolutionary, the Silver Surfer and Galactus battled Thor and the Asgardians. The battle ended when the Silver Surfer chose to leave his post as herald and guard an Asgardian artifact. Galactus "tethers" him to Asgard's location in Oklahoma, resulting in his powers waning the further he travels from Asgard, and grants him the ability to return to human form.

During the War with the Serpent, Silver Surfer aids Doctor Strange, Namor, Loa, and Lyra in the liberation of New Atlantis from Attuma, who was transformed into Nerkodd: Breaker of Oceans.

Silver Surfer and Dawn meet Glorian the Maker of Miracles, who plans to rebuild our universe for the heroes to return to after they finish in Battleworld. Glorian has also enlisted the help of the Shaper of Worlds. Glorian then greeted Silver Surfer and Dawn with a tantalizing offer: ally with the Shaper of Worlds to rebuild the universe that was lost. Dawn agreed to use her memories to restore Earth while Silver Surfer left to restore the rest of the universe, but Silver Surfer unmade Galactus while Dawn unknowingly created another version of Norrin. The Shaper of Worlds is not happy with the changes. Dawn and the Surfer embark on more adventures which culminate in their entering a universe predating the main continuity.

When Silver Surfer was displaced in time, he had an encounter with Knull. Silver Surfer was infected by one of Knull's symbiotes only to be saved by Ego the Living Planet. Gathering the energy from the cosmos, Silver Surfer managed to defeat Knull.

During the "King in Black" storyline, Silver Surfer passes by the planets that were ravaged by Knull. At the advice of Thor, Hugin and Munin summon Silver Surfer to Earth. Silver Surfer arrives to where the Enigma Force is and frees it from the symbiotes. Knull reels in pain and Eddie Brock is chosen to be the new Captain Universe. As Silver Surfer faces off against him, Knull recalls his previous fight against him. Through the God of Light, Silver Surfer assumes a chrome form and turns his surfboard into a sword while Knull transforms his armor into one that would enable him to combat Silver Surfer. As Knull begins to fight Silver Surfer, the members of the Avengers, Fantastic Four, and X-Men charge towards Knulls so that they can aid Silver Surfer. Just then, Venom appears having been transformed into Captain Universe stating that he will handle Knull for them. With their weapons separated from the battle axe form following Knull's death, Thor and Silver Surfer noted that things will not be back to normal soon.

Powers and abilities
The Silver Surfer wields the Power Cosmic, granting him superhuman strength, endurance, and senses and the ability to absorb and manipulate the universe's ambient energy. The Surfer can navigate through interstellar space and hyperspace, which he can enter after exceeding the speed of light allowing traversing interstellar and intergalactic distances to other galaxies millions and even billions of light years away. He has proven capable of time travel on several occasions and can transport other people through time.

The Surfer sustains himself by converting matter into energy; he does not require food, water, air, or sleep, but occasionally enters a sleep-like meditation to dream. He can survive in nearly any known natural environment, including deep space, hyperspace, black holes and stars. The Surfer can project energy in various forms for offensive and defensive use, including force fields, bolts of cosmic force powerful enough to destroy entire planets, and create black holes. He can utilize the Power Cosmic to augment his superhuman strength to indeterminate levels. The Surfer can heal both himself and other living organisms, though he cannot raise the dead, and he has proven capable of revitalizing and evolving organic life on a planet-wide scale. He can cast illusions, create interdimensional portals to other locations including microverses, manipulate and phase through solid matter, and exercise some level of control over the astral plane. However, using these abilities results in his becoming greatly weakened, making their use limited.

His senses enable him to detect objects and concentrations of energy light years away and to perceive matter and energy in subatomic detail, including life energies of living beings. The Surfer can even see through time, and can achieve limited perception of past and future events in his general vicinity with concentration. He has demonstrated telepathic ability, including mind-reading, and can influence human emotion and sensation.

The Surfer's board is composed of a nearly impervious, cosmically powered silvery material similar to his own skin. The board is mentally linked to the Surfer and moves in response to his mental commands even when he is not in physical contact with it. The board is nearly indestructible, but on the rare occasions it has been damaged or destroyed, the Surfer can repair or recreate it with little effort. The Surfer can attack opponents by directing the board against them, and the board is capable of temporarily absorbing and imprisoning other beings.

When Galactus exiled the Surfer to Earth, his means of imprisonment was linked to the board. When the Surfer and the Fantastic Four realized this, the Surfer put it to the test by leaving the board planet-side and entering space in the Four's spacecraft. Once he was free of Earth, the Surfer remotely converted the board to energy, recalled it to him, and reformed it in space.

The Surfer has displayed the ability to shed his silver skin and revert to his original appearance as Norrin Radd, masking the Power Cosmic and allowing him to be more inconspicuous when needed. In this state, he can properly eat, drink and sleep.

Other versions

Ultimate Marvel
Warren Ellis's Ultimate Galactus Trilogy originally suggested that the Ultimates' ally the Vision was the herald of Galactus, a robotic probe that travels through space warning civilizations of the impending arrival of Gah Lak Tus. In the final miniseries of the trilogy, Ultimate Extinction, silvery humanoids began to appear, sent to trigger mass suicides to reduce the population's resistance. Suicide cults founded by the creatures began to appear all across the globe as Gah Lak Tus drew near. These silvery beings had the ability to grow wings; morph into an ovoid; form spikes; or take an intermediary form, gliding on an oval surface. They also demonstrated the ability to manipulate large quantities of energy.

In Ultimate Fantastic Four #42, another Ultimate incarnation of the Silver Surfer appears, called the Silver Searcher. He is teleported to Earth after Reed mistakes him for a star that he is trying to harness. His appearance triggers planet-wide chaos and natural calamities. In #43, Reed comments that Gah Lak Tus seems to have modeled its drones on this surfer, and he gives his name as Norin Radd. The Searcher states that he will summon his "master", who will make the population of the Earth happier than they have ever been.

In #44, the Surfer's master is revealed to be Zenn-La's ruler, Revka Temerlune Edifex Scyros III, "the king without enemies", who uses mind-control to make the population of Earth worship him (before it takes effect on the Fantastic Four, the Human Torch calls him "Psycho-Man"). It is revealed that the Surfer has been exiled from Zenn-La for destroying the control that Psycho-Man had over Zenn-La, but because of finding Earth for his master to "save" he may return. After Psycho-Man gains domain over Earth, the Silver Surfer, temporarily imprisoned in his own 'memorial' statue, rescues Mr. Fantastic, tells him his story, and asks him to save Earth. The Surfer then helps the Fantastic Four defeat other Surfer-like assassins of Psycho-Man. With the Surfers beaten and the insane Psycho-Man reprogrammed to experience the unthinking happiness he had imposed on others, Silver Surfer wanders the space ways.

In Ultimate X-Men, Jean Grey as Phoenix travels through space and is stopped by what is named as "A Silver Surfer". He informs Phoenix that the Watchers disapprove of the problems her flight across the universe is causing and briefly battles her before asking what she is looking for.

Exiles
On Earth 552, Norrin Radd had been a great military scientist who accidentally destroyed his own world with his greatest invention. Determined to bring it back to existence, he approached Galactus, Restorer of Worlds, and became his herald in the hope that Galactus would resurrect his world in exchange for his service. However, Galactus had taken an oath to only revive those worlds destroyed by the Blight. An enraged Silver Surfer then turned against his master, destroying those who worshiped him and attempting to kill Galactus himself to steal the knowledge of world restoration. This led to the destruction of Earth, the coming of the Exiles, the deaths of the Shi'ar Imperial Elite Guard, and inevitably the Surfer's own destruction at the claws of a cosmically empowered Sabretooth.

Marvel Zombies
The Silver Surfer remains uninfected in the Marvel Zombies on Earth-2149. Instead of coming to Earth and meeting the Fantastic Four, he is attacked by a horde of zombies. After fighting valiantly, he is killed by the Hulk, and his body is devoured by a few of the zombies (Hulk, Colonel America, Giant-Man, Iron Man, Luke Cage, Wolverine, and Spider-Man). His corpse grants the zombies a portion each of his cosmic powers, which they use to kill all of the other zombie heroes and villains whom they consider "competition" for what's left of the living. Afterwards, Pym creates a machine that concentrates the Cosmic powers they all share to create a massive blast that kills Galactus, at which point they eat him. Now imbued with the power of Galactus himself (and realizing they can now fly and survive in space), they adopt his role, traveling the universe and picking worlds clean of life.<ref name="marvelzombies5">Marvel Zombies #5 (April 2006). Marvel Comics.</ref>

MC2
During the finale of Last Planet Standing, the Silver Surfer foils Galactus's plan to create a new Big Bang, merging with Galactus himself in the process to become a new being. Gaining control of Galactus's powers, the new entity undoes the damage done by the old Galactus.

The Keeper
In the alternate timeline of Earth-691, notably the Guardians of the Galaxy issues #24 and #25 story arc, Norrin Radd was featured as The Keeper. This new version of the Silver Surfer, sans his surfboard, had Quantum Bands, which augmented his "Power Cosmic" and designated him as the Protector of the Universe, as with other bearers of the Bands before him. He works with the Guardians in an attempt to kill Galactus once and for all, his first attempt with Firelord and Dargo-Thor having failed. Eventually, the Keeper realizes that, with his augmented power, he can supply Galactus with the energy he needs and end the Planet-Eater's consumption of worlds. Eon, cosmic being and creator of the Quantum Bands, reveals that this was the ultimate purpose of the Keeper becoming the Protector of the Universe, and he enters into a symbiotic partnership with Galactus, who accepts the Keeper as an equal; he is last seen leaving with Galactus, riding a silver surfboard once more.

Earth X
In issue 11 and 12 of the Earth X series, Black Bolt calls upon Galactus to come destroy the Celestial seed growing within Earth. The Silver Surfer accompanies him along with his love Shalla-Bal, who had now been turned into a silver herald of Galactus as well.

Green Lantern/Silver Surfer: Unholy Alliances
In Green Lantern/Silver Surfer: Unholy Alliances, the Silver Surfer confronts Cyborg Superman over the destruction of a planet and is met by Parallax. Parallax beats the Cyborg, but the Silver Surfer lets him go and tries to sympathize with Parallax. The two return to Earth to find Kyle Rayner with Thanos, leading them to believe they formed an alliance when in reality Thanos tricked Kyle. Kyle convinces the Surfer to help him stop Parallax and Thanos from destroying the universe and that he was duped into giving Thanos Oa's power. The Surfer similarly gave most of his power to Parallax to reform the destroyed planet, forcing Kyle to use his ring to drain both villains of their enhanced powers before they can destroy everything. Unable to contain the power himself, Kyle channels the power from the two villains into the Silver Surfer, who opens a portal and sucks the two inside.

What If?
Silver Surfer was featured in different issues of What If? What If? vol. 2 #25, "What If the Marvel Super-Heroes had lost Atlantis Attacks?", had Silver Surfer and Quasar as the survivors of an attack by Set. With the help of Thor (who is horribly burned and placed in stasis to keep him alive), Silver Surfer and Quasar destroy two of Set's heads before Quasar (empowered by the Uni-Power) sacrifices his freedom to exile himself and Set inside Doctor Strange's Eye of Agamotto. Silver Surfer gives the Eye of Agamotto to Uatu the Watcher for safekeeping as Set's children are born.
 What If? vol. 2 #108, "What If The Avengers Battled The Carnage Cosmic?", revolved around the Cosmic Carnage where the Carnage symbiote remained bonded to the Surfer, forcing Spider-Man and the Avengers to battle him until Firestar was able to use her powers to disrupt the symbiote's control over the Surfer. After his powers were used to destroy dozens of New York City blocks and realizing that there was only one way to stop the symbiote, the Silver Surfer flew himself into the sun, seemingly destroying both himself and the creature.
 In What If? vol. 2 #49, "What If the Silver Surfer Possessed the Infinity Gauntlet?" In the original Infinity Gauntlet story arc, the Silver Surfer plays the role of messenger, having witnessed firsthand the resurrection of Thanos and the beginning of his quest to obtain the six Infinity Gems (as told in The Thanos Quest miniseries). In this issue, the story of the Gauntlet is partially retold and shows Thanos in space with the Gauntlet, ruling over all existence. In the original Infinity Gauntlet story, Nebula intercepts the gauntlet from Thanos; however, in What If? vol. 2 #49, the Surfer takes the gauntlet and wears it himself. Initially, the Surfer tries to use the gauntlet for good, but ultimately the supreme power of the gauntlet forces the Surfer to destroy it to avoid becoming corrupted by it. Prior to destroying the gauntlet, the Surfer creates a distant planet for himself and Shalla Bal (his wife) to reside on for all time and the Surfer returns to his mortal form of Norrin Radd. This story is told from the perspective of the Watcher who continually observes the universe and refuses to interfere in the natural unfolding of things.

Ruins
In Warren Ellis's Ruins, the Silver Surfer is briefly seen when described by Mar-Vell to reporter Phil Sheldon. When the Kree Liberation Force set forth to invade Earth, they found the floating mutilated corpse of the Surfer near Earth's moon. Mar-Vell says that he and his comrades concluded that the Surfer had been driven mad because of his lack of need for oxygen and clawed open his chest to expose his lungs to the atmosphere, but died of shock.

In other media
Television
 Silver Surfer appears in Fantastic Four (1967), voiced by Vic Perrin.
 Silver Surfer appears in Fantastic Four (1994), voiced by Robin Sachs in the first season and Edward Albert in the series finale "Doomsday".
 Silver Surfer appears in a self-titled TV series, voiced by Paul Essiembre.
 Silver Surfer appears in The Super Hero Squad Show, voiced by Mikey Kelley. This version speaks with a "surfer dude" accent. In the first season, he serves as a member of the titular Super Hero Squad before returning to space to keep the Infinity Sword safe. In the second season however, he was corrupted by its power, became the Dark Surfer, steals the Infinity Gems and Gauntlet from Thanos, and uses all of the items' power to destroy two-thirds of the universe, send Earth away from the sun, and scatter the Super Hero Squad across the timeline, universe, and multiverse. Eventually, the squad reunite, restore the Earth to its proper place, and defeat the Dark Surfer, purifying him and shattering the Infinity Gauntlet, Gems, and Sword into Infinity Fractals. Following this, the Silver Surfer apologizes for his misdeeds and promises to return to the squad once he pays his debt to the universe.
 Silver Surfer appears in the Hulk and the Agents of S.M.A.S.H. episode "Fear Itself", voiced by Brent Spiner.

Film
 In 1989, Erik Fleming, then a film student from the USC School of Cinematic Arts, and Robert Letterman approached Marvel Studios and Constantin Film's producer Bernd Eichinger to ask permission to make a short film featuring the Silver Surfer as a proof of concept for the use of CGI in creating a realistic silver-colored human figure. Supervised by Steven Robiner, this five-minute short film was completed in 1991 not long after the release of Terminator 2: Judgment Day, which also featured a similarly rendered character, and premiered at First Look USC Film Festival on September 21, 1993. This led to significant interest from major studios in a feature-length Silver Surfer project. Andrew Kevin Walker wrote a script for 20th Century Fox in 2000, but nothing ever came of it.
 Silver Surfer appears in Fantastic Four: Rise of the Silver Surfer, portrayed by Doug Jones and voiced by Laurence Fishburne. This version's board serves as a beacon for Galactus and serves as the source of the Silver Surfer's powers.
 In 2007, 20th Century Fox hired J. Michael Straczynski to write the screenplay for a spin-off film. Straczynski said his script was a sequel, but would also delve into the Silver Surfer's origins. In mid-2009, Straczynski expressed doubts that spin-off would be produced. 
 In February 2018, it was reported that 20th Century Fox was developing a Silver Surfer solo film with writer Brian K. Vaughan working on a script. In March 2019, Disney acquired 20th Century Fox, resulting in the Silver Surfer's film rights reverting to Marvel Studios. In September 2019, The GWW reported that Marvel Studios was developing the solo film.

Video games
 Silver Surfer appears in a self-titled video game.
 Evil clones of the Silver Surfer appear in Marvel Super Heroes: War of the Gems.
 Silver Surfer appears as a non-player character (NPC) and an unlockable character in Marvel: Ultimate Alliance, voiced by Chris Cox.
 Silver Surfer appears in the Fantastic Four: Rise of the Silver Surfer tie-in game, voiced by Brian Bloom.
 Silver Surfer appears as a playable character in Marvel Super Hero Squad: The Video Game, voiced again by Mikey Kelley.
 The Silver Surfer appears as an NPC in and the final boss of Marvel Super Hero Squad: The Infinity Gauntlet, voiced again by Mikey Kelley.
 The Silver and Dark Surfer appear as playable characters in Marvel Super Hero Squad Online, voiced again by Mikey Kelley,
 Silver Surfer makes a cameo appearance in Zero's ending in Marvel vs. Capcom 3: Fate of Two Worlds.
 Silver Surfer appears in Pinball FX 2 via the Fantastic Four table.
 Silver Surfer appears in Lego Marvel Super Heroes, voiced by James Arnold Taylor. While searching for planets to feed Galactus, he is pursued by Iron Man and S.H.I.E.L.D. until Doctor Doom knocks him out of the sky, causing his board to shatter into several "Cosmic Bricks". After the Fantastic Four and Nick Fury rescue the Silver Surfer and take him to the S.H.I.E.L.D. Helicarrier to recuperate, Earth's heroes and villains set out to collect the Cosmic Bricks.
 Silver Surfer initially appeared as a playable character in Marvel Heroes before he was removed on July 1, 2017 for legal reasons.
 Silver Surfer appears as a playable character in Marvel Contest of Champions.
 Silver Surfer appears as a playable character in Marvel: Future Fight.
 Silver Surfer and his board appear as purchasable cosmetics in Fortnite Battle Royale.

Books
 The Silver Surfer was the subject of an anthology of short prose fiction stories titled The Ultimate Silver Surfer, edited by Stan Lee and published by Berkley (October 1997, softcover, 306 pages). This book (and others starring Spider-Man and the X-Men, with similar titles) pre-dated Marvel's use of the "Ultimate" brand name in comics.
 The Silver Surfer appears in the prose fiction novel Fantastic Four: Redemption of the Silver Surfer, by Michael Jan Friedman and also published by Berkley (April 1998, softcover, 260 pages).
 The Silver Surfer appears in the Fantastic 4: Rise of the Silver Surfer novelization, by writer Daniel Joseph, published by Pocket Star (April 2007, softcover, 272 pages).

Music
 The Silver Surfer is referenced in the Marc Bolan and T. Rex song "Teenage Dream".
 The Silver Surfer appears on the cover of the Joe Satriani album Surfing with the Alien. Though Satriani was unfamiliar with the character at the time, the album's production manager suggested the character's usage. Following this, Satriani became inspired by the Silver Surfer's mythos to create "Back to Shalla-Bal" for the Flying in a Blue Dream album and "The Power Cosmic 2000", a two-part song on the Engines of Creation album.
 The British metal band Bal-Sagoth named their fourth album The Power Cosmic and dedicated one song to the Silver Surfer, "The Scourge of the Fourth Celestial Host".

Miscellaneous
The Silver Surfer and the cover of the first issue of the 1968 Fantastic Four series appear in a series of commemorative Marvel Comics stamps released by the United States Postal Service in November 2007.

Merchandise

Toys
The Silver Surfer has appeared in several Marvel-based action figure and toy lines, including one celebrating the 30th anniversary of the character's first appearance, and three based on the 1998 animated series.

The Silver Surfer is the seventh figurine in the Classic Marvel Figurine Collection.
Hasbro released the Silver Surfer in its Marvel Universe toyline both individually and included with Marvel Masterworks Galactus. A "clear" variant was released with the "dark" variant of Galactus.
Silver Surfer is a playable character in the "Avengers", "Critical Mass", "Supernova", and "Galactic Guardians" sets of Marvel HeroClix.

Trading cards
The Silver Surfer starred in his own "all-prism" trading card series in 1993, released by Comics Images.

He has also appeared in many of Marvel's other trading card sets, notably each of the Marvel Universe Cards, Marvel Masterpieces, and Marvel Flair Cards trading card series as well as the Marvel OverPower trading card game.

Reception
The Silver Surfer was ranked as the 47th-greatest comic book character of all time by Wizard magazine. IGN also ranked the Silver Surfer as the 41st-greatest comic book hero quoting that "Silver Surfer has the coolest mode of transportation this side of Ghost Rider, but his powers come with a heavy burden."

The 2014 series was given a negative review by Newsarama's Pierce Lydon, who cites Laura Allred's coloring as the issue's biggest flaw. Iann Robinson, writing for CraveOnline, said the issue misses the point of the Silver Surfer character altogether. ComicBooked writer Cal Cleary gave the issue a perfect score, citing deep characterization and intricate design, praise largely echoed by Comics Alliance's Matt D. Wilson.

In 2018, CBR.com ranked Silver Surfer 5th in their "25 Fastest Characters In The Marvel Universe" list.

 Collected editions 
The character's various series have been collected into the following trade paperbacks:Silver Surfer Omnibus (collects Silver Surfer vol. 1 #1–18, Fantastic Four Annual #5 and Not Brand Echh #13, 576 pages, hardcover, Marvel Comics, June 2007)Marvel Masterworks: The Silver Surfer (Marvel Comics):Volume 1 (collects Silver Surfer vol. 1 #1–6 and Fantastic Four Annual #5, 260 pages, June 1991)Volume 2 (collects Silver Surfer #7–18, 272 pages, December 1991)Essential Silver Surfer (Marvel Comics):Volume 1 (collects Silver Surfer vol. 1 #1–18 and Fantastic Four Annual #5, 528 pages, March 1998)Volume 2 (collects Silver Surfer vol. 2 #1, Silver Surfer vol. 3 #1–18, Annual #1, and Marvel Fanfare #51, 600 pages, June 2007)
Epic Collection: Silver SurferVolume 1: When Calls Galactus (collects Fantastic Four #48–50, #55, #57–60, #72, #74–77, and material from Tales to Astonish #92–93 and Fantastic Four #56, #61 and Annual #5, November 14, Marvel Comics)Volume 3: Freedom (collects Silver Surfer (1982) #1, Silver Surfer (1987) #1–14, Super-Villain Classics #1; material from Epic Illustrated #1, Marvel Fanfare (1982) #51, November 2015, Marvel Comics)Volume 4: Parable (collects Silver Surfer (1987) #15-23 and other material, June 2022, Marvel Comics)Volume 6: Thanos Quest (collects Silver Surfer (1987) #39–50, Annual #3; Thanos Quest #1–2; material from Marvel Comics Presents (1988) #50)Volume 7: The Infinity Gauntlet (collects Silver Surfer (1987) #51–66, Annual #4; and material from Marvel Comics Presents #69, #93–97, May 2017, Marvel Comics)Volume 13: Inner Demons (collects Silver Surfer (1987) #123–138, -1, Annual '97)The Definitive Silver Surfer (collects Silver Surfer vol. 1 #1, Silver Surfer vol. 2 #1, Silver Surfer vol. 4 #1–2, Fantastic Four vol. 1 #48–50, Tales to Astonish #92–93 and Tomb of Dracula #50, 260 pages, August 2007, Panini Comics)Silver Surfer: Rebirth of Thanos (collects Silver Surfer vol. 3 #34–38, The Thanos Quest miniseries, and "The Final Flower!" from Logan's Run #6, 224 pages, Marvel Comics, softcover, April 2006, hardcover, August 2010)Silver Surfer: Parable (collects Silver Surfer vol. 4 #1–2, 72 pages, hardcover, December 1988, Marvel Comics, softcover, 1998)Silver Surfer: Parable (collects Silver Surfer vol. 4 #1–2 and Silver Surfer: The Enslavers graphic novel, 168 pages, Marvel Comics, hardcover, May 2012)Silver Surfer: Communion (collects Silver Surfer vol. 5 #1–6, 136 pages, June 2004, Marvel Comics)Silver Surfer: Requiem (collects Silver Surfer: Requiem #1–4, 104 pages, hardcover, December 2007, Marvel Comics, softcover, July 2008)Silver Surfer: In Thy Name (collects Silver Surfer: In Thy Name #1–4, 96 pages, softcover, June 2008, Marvel Comics)Silver Surfer: Devolution (collects Silver Surfer vol. 6 #1–5, 200 pages, September 2011, Marvel Comics)
Silver Surfer Vol 1: New Dawn (collects Silver Surfer vol. 7 #1–5, 128 pages, November 2014, Marvel Comics)
Silver Surfer Vol 2: Worlds Apart (collects Silver Surfer vol. 7 #6–10, 120 pages, Jun 2015, Marvel Comics)
Silver Surfer Vol 3: Last Days (collects Silver Surfer vol. 7 #11–15, 120 pages, December 2015, Marvel Comics)
Silver Surfer Vol 4: Citizen of Earth (collects Silver Surfer vol. 8 #1–6, 144 pages, October 2016, Marvel Comics)
Silver Surfer Vol 5: A Power Greater Than Cosmic (collects Silver Surfer vol. 8 #7–14, 176 pages, November 2017, Marvel Comics)
Silver Surfer: Slott & Allred Omnibus (collects Silver Surfer vol 7. #1–15, vol. 8 #1–14 and All-New Marvel Now! Point One'' #1, 688 pages, December 2018, Marvel Comics)

References

External links

 
 Silver Surfer at the Grand Comics Database. Retrieved on June 4, 2017.
 Silver Surfer at Don Markstein's Toonopedia Archived from the original on June 4, 2017.
 The Complete Silver Surfer Appearance List.
 

 
1968 comics debuts
Characters created by Jack Kirby
Characters created by Stan Lee
Comics characters introduced in 1966
Fiction set around Deneb
Fantastic Four characters
Fictional astronomers
Fictional characters who can turn intangible
Fictional characters who can turn invisible
Fictional characters with absorption or parasitic abilities
Fictional characters with dimensional travel abilities
Fictional characters with elemental transmutation abilities
Fictional characters with energy-manipulation abilities
Fictional characters with healing abilities
Fictional characters with superhuman durability or invulnerability
Fictional characters with superhuman senses
Fictional gladiators
Fictional illusionists
Fictional surfers
Guardians of the Galaxy characters
Male characters in film
Marvel Comics aliens
Marvel Comics characters who can move at superhuman speeds
Marvel Comics characters who have mental powers
Marvel Comics characters with accelerated healing
Marvel Comics characters with superhuman strength
Marvel Comics extraterrestrial superheroes
Marvel Comics film characters
Marvel Comics male superheroes
Marvel Comics telekinetics
Marvel Comics telepaths
Science fiction comics characters
Science fiction comics
Time travelers